Ohbora Bosai Dam is a gravity dam located in Gifu Prefecture in Japan. The dam is used for flood control and irrigation. The catchment area of the dam is 0.4 km2. The dam impounds about 1  ha of land when full and can store 43 thousand cubic meters of water. The construction of the dam was started on 1947 and completed in 1952.

References

Dams in Gifu Prefecture